Peckham Glacier is a steep tributary glacier in the Britannia Range, flowing south from Mount McClintock into Byrd Glacier. Named by Advisory Committee on Antarctic Names (US-ACAN) for Verne E. Peckham, biologist, McMurdo Station winter party 1962, who with use of SCUBA gear made numerous dives under the sea ice of McMurdo Sound at Winter Quarters Bay and off Cape Evans.

References
 

Glaciers of Oates Land